Mark Knowles and Daniel Nestor were the defending champions, but lost in semifinals to Todd Woodbridge and Mark Woodforde.

Jonas Björkman and Byron Black won the title, by defeating Woodbridge and Woodforde 6–3, 7–6(8–6) in the final.

Seeds
The first four seeds received a bye into the second round.

Draw

Finals

Top half

Bottom half

References

 Official results archive (ATP)
 Official results archive (ITF)

Doubles